Algimonas ampicilliniresistens is a Gram-negative, prosthecate and motile bacterium from the genus of Algimonas which has been isolated from the alga Porphyra yezoensis.

References 

Caulobacterales
Bacteria described in 2013